The Kandi K23 is a microvan produced by the Chinese manufacturer Kandi Technologies.

History 
The K23 model completed the Kandi brand offer as a small microvan with an avant-garde design. The car adopted a single-body silhouette rich in numerous moldings, with soaring, high-placed headlights at the front and a chrome-plated air intake imitation, while the rear part of the body is decorated with lamps placed in the pillars.

Sale
Like the smaller K27 model, the K23 is the first car in the history of the manufacturer that, apart from the domestic Chinese market, also went on sale in the United States in the second half of 2020.

Technical data
The electric system of the Kandi K23 is made of a battery with a capacity of 41.4 kWh, which provides a maximum range of up to 280 kilometers per charge. Replenishing the full condition of the batteries takes about 7.5 hours.

References 

2020s cars
Cars introduced in 2018
Production electric cars
Microvans
Front-wheel-drive vehicles
K23